Kata ya Foresti (English: Forest Ward) is an administrative ward in the Mbeya Urban district of the Mbeya Region of Tanzania. In 2016 the Tanzania National Bureau of Statistics report there were 7,328 people in the ward, from 6,649 in 2012.

Neighborhoods 
The ward has 7 neighborhoods.
 Benki Kuu
 Forest Mpya
 Kadege
 Maghorofani
 Makanisani
 Meta
 Muungano

References 

Wards of Mbeya Region